The term Last of the Romans has historically been used to describe a person thought to embody the values of ancient Roman civilization – values which, by implication, became extinct on his death. It has been used to describe a number of individuals. The first recorded instance was Julius Caesar's description of Marcus Junius Brutus as the one with whom the old Roman spirit would become extinct.

List of people described as the "Last of the Romans"

In Ancient and Medieval Mediterranean 
 Gaius Cassius Longinus (d. 42 BC), so called by Brutus and by the ancient historian Aulus Cremutius Cordus.
 Gaius Asinius Pollio (75 BC – AD 4), one of the last great orators and writers of the Roman Republic.
 Valentinian I (321–375), the last Western Emperor to campaign extensively on both sides of the Rhine and Danube frontiers.
 Valens (328–378), "the Last True Roman"  Eastern Emperor (and brother of Valentinian I) who led his army to a catastrophic defeat in the Battle of Adrianople.
 Stilicho, a powerful Vandalic-Roman general in the early 5th century. Also called "the last of the Roman generals" in Chapter XXX of Edward Gibbon's The History of the Decline and Fall of the Roman Empire. 
 Flavius Aëtius (396?–454), a general in the late Western Roman Empire who defended Gaul against the Franks and other barbarians, and defeated Attila in the Catalaunian Fields  near Châlons, in 451. His assassination by Valentinian III lowered the final curtain on the Western Empire. So called by Procopius.
 Count Boniface (died 432), a general in the late Western Roman Empire. Rival of Flavius Aëtius. So called by Procopius.
 Galla Placidia (388-450), empress consort to Constantius III and mother of Valentinian III, she was "the last Roman empress"  and de facto ruler of the Western Roman Empire from 425 to 437.  
 Majorian (420–461), Roman Emperor between 457 and 461. He was the last emperor universally recognized as the de facto ruler of the entire western empire, briefly reconquering most of the lost territories in Gaul and Hispania.
 Ambrosius Aurelianus (5th century), a Romano-British military commander against the Anglo-Saxon invasion. So called by Gildas.
 Anicius Manlius Severinus Boethius (480–525?), one of the last great philosophers of Rome. He was regarded as last of the Romans and first of the medieval scholastics by Martin Grabmann; also a canonized saint.
 Gildas (fl. early 6th century), Romano-British clergyman, writer and saint.
 Justinian I "the Great" (482?–565), second of the Justinian Dynasty, and probably the last Byzantine emperor to speak Latin as a first language.
 Flavius Belisarius (505?–565), a widely acclaimed general of the Byzantine Empire under Justinian, known for his reconquest of portions of the Western Empire.
 Flavius Magnus Aurelius Cassiodorus Senator (c. 485 – c. 580), Roman statesman and writer.
 Gregory the Great (540?–604), an influential Pope and native to Rome.
 Desiderius of Cahors (580?–655), Gallo-Roman aristocrat, bishop, and saint.

In England 
 William Congreve, called "Ultimus Romanorum" by Alexander Pope.
 Samuel Johnson, called "Ultimus Romanorum" by Thomas Carlyle.
 H. H. Asquith, "last of the Romans" was used on numerous occasions for him after his fall from power in 1916.

In the United States 
In the United States, "last of the Romans" was used on numerous occasions during the early 19th century as an epithet for the political leaders and statesmen who participated in the American Revolution by signing the United States Declaration of Independence, taking part in the American Revolutionary War, or established the United States Constitution.

List of rulers who, in a more literal sense, also could be described as "Last of the Romans"
 Romulus Augustulus (deposed 476), the last de facto Western Roman Emperor.
 Julius Nepos (died 480), the last de jure Western Roman Emperor.
 Ovida (?–480) the last Roman commander in Illyricum, defeated and killed by Odoacer.
 Syagrius (430–486/487), the last Roman commander in Gaul (referred to by Gregory of Tours as "King of the Romans") before the invasion of the Franks.
 Tiberius Petasius (died 731), the last Italian-born Byzantine usurper while the Duchy of Rome was still part of the Eastern Roman Empire  
Constantine VI (780–797), last Eastern Roman Emperor to be recognized universally (i.e., including Western Europe) as Roman Emperor during his own time as Charlemagne was enthroned as "Emperor of the Romans" in 800.
 Llywelyn ap Gruffudd (died 1282), the last Prince of the Kingdom of Gwynedd, the last post-Roman (Romano-British) successor state to fall in the West.
 Constantine XI Palaiologos (1405–1453), Byzantine Emperor who died defending Constantinople's fall to the Ottomans. Upon this victory, Mehmed II would claim the title "Kayser-i Rum" ("Caesar of the Romans")
 David II Komnenos (died 1463), final emperor of Trebizond and de facto final Roman Emperor after Constantine XI.
 Alexander of Theodoro (died 1475), final Prince of Theodoro and final Trebizondian leader to be conquered by the Ottomans.
 Leonardo III Tocco, final Despot of Epirus and final Byzantine leader to be conquered by the Ottomans in 1479.

References

 
Honorary titles
Titles
Western Roman Empire